McAdam High School is a grades 6–12 school located in southwestern McAdam, New Brunswick.  It was founded in 1924, and 1984, a more modern building was constructed.  McAdam High is known for its cooperative education program.  The town, and its high school, are named for late-19th-century politician John McAdam.

The school is located at 29 Lake Avenue, McAdam, NB E6J 1N7.

Sports

The school's sports teams are members of the New Brunswick Interscholastic Athletic Association.  In 2012, none of the students at McAdam High did better than 4th place in the provincial athletic competition.

A skateboard park, funded by a Royal Canadian Mounted Police Foundation grant, opened in 2011 adjacent to the high school.

References

External links

 School Profile at its official website
 Facebook page
 Government of New Brunswick Department of Ediucation ratings
 Blog on a field trip to the provincial Capitol

High schools in New Brunswick
Middle schools in New Brunswick
Schools in York County, New Brunswick